These are the most popular given names in the United States for all years of the 1930s.

1930 

Males
Robert
James
John
William
Richard
Charles
Donald
George
Joseph
Edward
Females
Mary
Betty
Dorothy
Helen
Barbara
Margaret
Maria
Patricia
Doris
Joan; Ruth (tie)

1931 

Males
Robert
James
John
William
Richard
Charles
Donald
George
Joseph
Thomas
Females
Mary
Betty
Dorothy
Barbara
Joan
Helen
Maria
Patricia
Margaret

1932 

Males
Robert
John
James
William
Charles
Richard
Donald
George
Joseph
Thomas
Females
Mary
Betty
Barbara
Dorothy
Joan
Patricia
Shirley
Margaret
Doris
Helen

1933 

Males
Robert
James
John
William
Richard
Donald
Charles
Joseph
George
Thomas
Females
Mary
Betty
Barbara
Dorothy
Joan
Patricia
Maria
Helen
Margaret
Doris

1934 

Males
Robert
James
John
William
Richard
Charles
Donald
George
Thomas
Joseph
Females
Mary
Betty
Shirley
Barbara
Joan
Patricia
Dorothy
Maria
Margaret
Helen

1935 

Males
James
Robert
John
William
Richard
Charles
Donald
Thomas
Ronald
David
Females
Mary
Shirley
Barbara
Betty
Patricia
Joan
Dorothy
Margaret
Maria
Helen

1936 

Males
Robert
James
John
William
Donald
Richard
Charles
Ronald
George
Joseph
Females
Mary
Shirley
Barbara
Betty
Patricia
Maria
Dorothy; Nancy (tie)
Joan
Margaret
-----

1937 

Males
Robert
James
John
William
Richard
Donald
Charles
David
George
Thomas
Females
Mary
Barbara
Patricia
Shirley
Betty
Maria; Nancy (tie)
Dorothy
Carol
Margaret
-----

1938 

Males
Robert
James
John
William
Richard
Charles
Donald
David
George
Ronald; Thomas (tie)
Females
Mary
Barbara
Patricia
Betty
Shirley
Nancy
Carol; Maria
Margaret
Joan
-----

1939 

Males
Robert
James
John
William
Richard
Charles
David
Thomas
Donald
Ronald
Females
Mary
Barbara
Patricia
Betty
Shirley
Maria
Margaret
Carol
Nancy
Judith

References 
 Most Popular 1000 Names of the 1930s from the Social Security Administration

1930s
1930s in the United States